Spain is not a traditionally Orthodox country, as after the Great Schism of 1054 the Spanish Christians (at that time controlling the northern half of the Iberian Peninsula) remained within the sphere of influence of the Church of Rome. 

The Hispanic Church was part of the undivided Christian church for the first ten centuries of its history until the Great East-West Schism of 1054. Since then, Spain has remained with the Catholic Church of Rome, which separated from the other ancient Orthodox patriarchates.

The number of Orthodox adherents in the country began to increase in the early 1990s, when Spain experienced an influx of migrant workers from Eastern Europe. The dominant nationality among Spanish Orthodox adherents is Romanian (as many as 0.7 million people), with Bulgarians, Russians, Ukrainians, Moldovans, and others bringing the total to about 1 million. The number of Orthodox adherents from Spain and other countries that are not traditionally Orthodox has seen an increase in recent years. 

The territory is covered by the Metropolis of Spain and Portugal (Constantinople), Diocese of Madrid and Lisbon (Patriarchal Exarchate in Western Europe (Moscow Patriarchate) or PEWE), Diocese of Western Europe (Russian Orthodox Church Outside of Russia, Moscow-ROCOR), Diocese of Western and Central Europe (Bulgaria), Spanish Orthodox Church (Serbia), and the Metropolitanate of Western and Southern Europe (Romania).

See also
Religion in Spain
Catholic Church in Spain
Protestantism in Spain
Anglicanism in Spain
Serbian Orthodox Eparchy of Western Europe
Diocese of the Russian Orthodox Church in Spain and Portugal (Moscow Patriarchate)

Literature

External links
Canonical Churches:
 Holy Metropolis of Spain and Portugal
 Iglesia Ortodoxa Española: Official page of Spanish Orthodox Church

Iglesia Rusa Ortodoxa en España